Carex ormostachya, also known as necklace spike sedge, is a species of flowering plant in the sedge family, Cyperaceae. It is native to Eastern Canada and the Northeastern United States.

See also
 List of Carex species

References

ormostachya
Plants described in 1922
Flora of North America